Improv Asylum is an improvisational comedy theater in the North End neighborhood of Boston, Massachusetts, United States. The theatre was founded in 1998 by Paul D'Amato, Norm Laviolette, and Chet Harding. The theater produces multiple shows per week including its critically acclaimed mainstage show. The mainstage show is a blend of both sketch comedy and improvised scenes.

History
In December, Improv Asylum hosts "No Rest for the Wicked Funny," a 24-hour charity show for Globe Santa, a fund to purchase holiday gifts for underprivileged children.

In the spring of 2010, Improv Asylum produced "You're a Good Man, Scott Brown," an original musical satirizing the United States Senate special election in Massachusetts, 2010. Written and directed by Jeremy Brothers, the show garnered the attention of Senator Scott Brown and his wife, WCVB reporter Gail Huff who both attended the performance on March 31, 2010.

In addition to the theater in the North End, the Improv Asylum has also held shows in New York City and Los Angeles. In 2021, Improv Asylum added a New York expansion under the name Asylum NYC. New York facilities are at the former Upright Citizens Brigade Chelsea Space on Manhattan's west side.

The Asylum also offers a training center where students can learn the art of improvisation.

References

External links
Official website
The Improv Asylum North End
Improv Comedy Business Thriving in Tough Economy
No More Group Hugs with Frank from Accounting; Training Your Head to Think on its Feet!

1998 establishments in Massachusetts
Comedy clubs in the United States
North End, Boston
Theatres in Boston